Robert Lee Tobeck (born March 6, 1970) is a former American football center  who played fourteen seasons in the National Football League (NFL).  Tobeck played seven seasons for the Seattle Seahawks after being acquired as a free agent from the Atlanta Falcons after signing as a rookie in 1993.

Tobeck started his college career after accepting a scholarship to Liberty University in Lynchburg, Virginia, but was redshirted as a freshman.  He transferred to Kilgore College, a junior college in Kilgore, Texas for two years (1989-90) and then went on to play big league college football at Washington State University.

During high school, Tobeck attended New Port Richey (FL) Christian, which, until his senior year, only offered a flag football program. He only played 4 games of tackle football in High school. However, the basketball program was a standout and Tobeck was a major part of its program.

Tobeck retired at the end of the 2006 NFL season, on January 15, 2007 after a playoff loss to the Chicago Bears.  He played in two Super Bowls, Super Bowl XXXIII as a member of the Falcons and Super Bowl XL as a member of the Seahawks. Tobeck also made the NFC Pro Bowl Team in 2005.

After football Tobeck went into the insurance business and now co-owns Griffin MacLean Insurance Brokers. Tobeck has also dabbled in radio in his time since playing as a co-host of The Outdoor Line radio show. although he is no longer with the show.

References

External links 
Current Stats

1970 births
Living people
People from Lake Wales, Florida
Sportspeople from Polk County, Florida
Players of American football from Florida
American football centers
American football offensive guards
Atlanta Falcons players
Seattle Seahawks players
National Conference Pro Bowl players
Washington State Cougars football players
Kilgore Rangers football players